Released in 2003, Fartaqi is the third album by Ahmed Bukhatir.

External links
Official Website

Track listing

Ahmed Bukhatir albums
2003 albums